The John Dwan Office Building, located at 201 Waterfront Drive in Two Harbors, Minnesota, in the United States, is a historical building and now a museum for 3M.

History
The building was the location where John Dwan, a Two Harbors attorney drew up the incorporation papers for the Minnesota Mining and Manufacturing Company (now 3M) in 1902. The new company's vision was to mine and process corundum that the founders believed was plentiful on Lake Superior's north shore. The company nearly went bankrupt, because the mineral they were mining was useless as an abrasive and the high humidity at Lake Superior wreaked havoc with their adhesive process. Nevertheless, the company survived by receiving financial support from Lucius Pond Ordway, moving to Saint Paul, and changing its focus to manufacturing of abrasives with imported materials.

3M Museum
The attorney's office building remains as the 3M Museum, run by the Lake County Historical Society.  Exhibits include the recreated law office, company artifacts and documents, a lab display typical of 3M research and development work, and a hands-on program of technology applications.

References

External links
3M Museum - Lake County Historical Society

3M
Industry museums in Minnesota
Museums in Lake County, Minnesota
National Register of Historic Places in Lake County, Minnesota
Office buildings on the National Register of Historic Places in Minnesota
Office buildings completed in 1898